Villy-sur-Yères is a commune in the Seine-Maritime department in the Normandy region in northern France.

Geography
The village name was changed from Villy-le-Bas in 1998.

Population

Places of interest
 The church of St. Martin, dating from the twelfth century.
 The church of St. Aqualin, dating from the sixteenth century.
 Ruins of an old priory in the middle of a field.

See also
Communes of the Seine-Maritime department

References

Communes of Seine-Maritime